The 1990 Northern Illinois Huskies football team represented Northern Illinois University as an independent during the 1990 NCAA Division I-A football season. Led by Jerry Pettibone in his sixth and final season as head coach, the Huskies compiled a record of 6–5. Northern Illinois played home games at Huskie Stadium in DeKalb, Illinois.

Schedule

References

Northern Illinois
Northern Illinois Huskies football seasons
Northern Illinois Huskies football